The Independent Rural Party is a Swedish agrarian and Eurosceptic political party founded in 2010 which focuses on politics for rural areas.

Local election results and representation

Since 2018, the party is represented in twelve municipalities. The party has also taken part in the general elections in 2010, 2014 and 2018, but with limited results. The party received 0,06% of the vote in the 2014 general election, and 0,08% in the 2018 general election.

At its party congress on 16 April 2019, Stefan Torssell was appointed as party leader.

The party holds a total of 25 seats in the following municipalities:

Results in national elections

European Parliament election, 2019 
LpO contested the 2019 election to the European Parliament with six candidates. The party received 0,05% of the vote.

External links
 Official page

References

Minor political parties in Sweden
Political parties established in 2010
Nordic agrarian parties